The 1st constituency of Nógrád County is one of the single member constituencies of the National Assembly, the national legislature of Hungary. The constituency standard abbreviation: Nógrád 01. OEVK.

Since 2018, it has been represented by Károly Becsó of the Fidesz–KDNP party alliance.

Geography
The 1st constituency is located in eastern part of Nógrád County.

List of municipalities
The constituency includes the following municipalities:

History
The 1st constituency of Nógrád County was created in 2011 and contained of the pre-2011 abolished constituencies of 1st and part of 2nd and 3rd constituency of this County. Its borders have not changed since its creation.

Members
The constituency was first represented by Zsolt Becsó of the Fidesz from 2014 to 2018. Károly Becsó of the Fidesz was elected in 2018.

References

Nógrád 1st